The 99th Street station was a local station on the demolished IRT Second Avenue Line in Manhattan, New York City. It had three tracks and two side platforms. The next stop to the north was 105th Street. The next stop to the south was 92nd Street. The station closed on June 11, 1940. Three blocks to the south mass transit service was replaced by the 96th Street station of the Second Avenue Subway.

References

External links
 

IRT Second Avenue Line stations
Railway stations closed in 1942
Former elevated and subway stations in Manhattan
1942 disestablishments in New York (state)